Primorsk is a coastal town in Vyborgsky District of Leningrad Oblast, Russia and is the second largest Russian port on the Baltic, after St. Petersburg. Population:

History

It was first mentioned in Russian chronicles as Beryozovskoye (lit. birch settlement) in 1268, when the Hanseatic merchants from Gotland petitioned the Novgorod Republic to secure their passage to the Neva River. The original Finnish name Koivisto means "a group of birch trees", "a birch forest". Swedish name Björkö means "birch island". Swedes annexed the region during the Third Swedish Crusade. The Russians retook the islands at the close of the Great Northern War in 1721. This was confirmed by the Treaty of Nystad in 1721.

In 1710, during the Great Northern War, the troops of Tsar Peter the Great included the whole area of the modern Vyborgsky District to Russia. In the course of Peter's second administrative reform, the area became a part of Vyborg Province of St. Petersburg Governorate. The 1721 Treaty of Nystad, which concluded the war with Sweden, finalized the transfer of this part of Old Finland to Russia.
In 1744, Vyborg Governorate, with the seat in Vyborg, was established. After several changes, Vyborg Governorate was renamed Finland Governorate in 1802. In 1811, it was renamed back and included in the Grand Duchy of Finland, which was previously ceded to Russia by Sweden. In Finland, it became known as the Viipuri Province. 
On July 24, 1905 Wilhelm II of the German Empire and Tsar Nicholas II of Russia signed the Treaty of Björkö (Treaty of Koivisto) as  a secret mutual defense accord.
In 1918, the Viipuri Province became a part of independent Finland.

Koivisto, together with the rest of the Karelian Isthmus, was ceded by Finland to the Soviet Union by the Moscow Peace Treaty as a result of the Winter War. It was recaptured by Finns in early September 1941 following the Soviet defeat at the Battle of Porlampi. The Finns held Koivisto during Continuation War but again ceded the town to the Soviet Union after the Moscow Armistice. This secession was formalized after signing Paris Peace Treaty in 1947. The population was resettled to Finland and population from Central Russia was moved to populate the Karelian Isthmus.

On May 16, 1940, Koivisto became the administrative center of the newly established Koyvistovsky District in Leningrad Oblast. At the same time, Koivisto was granted town status. On October 1, 1948, the town was renamed Primorsk and the district was renamed Primorsky. On April 3, 1954, Primorsky District was abolished and merged into Roshchinsky District, with the administrative center in Roshchino. On January 4, 1957, Primorsk was transferred to Vyborgsky District.

Primorsk evolved in the 20th century as an outport for the town of Vyborg.

Administrative and municipal status
Within the framework of administrative divisions, it is, together with twenty rural localities, incorporated within Vyborgsky District as Primorskoye Settlement Municipal Formation. As a municipal division, Primorskoye Settlement Municipal Formation is incorporated within Vyborgsky Municipal District as Primorskoye Urban Settlement.

Economy

Port of Primorsk
The town is the site of reportedly the largest Baltic Sea oil terminal, Port of Primorsk. It was developed as a terminus of the Baltic Pipeline System at a cost of two billion US dollars. The terminal started to operate in December 2001, supplanting Ventspils and other foreign rivals within one year. In 2006, Primorsk was ranked first in Russia in crude oil export, with the export volume of 5,863,000 metric tons.

In the wake of the 2022 Russian invasion of Ukraine, on April 29, 2022, Rosneft was not scheduled to export any diesel from Primorsk in May, as demand from Europe dropped off due to sanctions.

Transportation
The town is on the railway line linking St. Petersburg to Vyborg. There is suburban train service to Finland Station in St. Petersburg.

The town is connected by roads with Vyborg and with Zelenogorsk and is also linked by bus to other localities nearby.

Notable people
Eino Kirjonen, Olympic ski jumper
Voitto Soini, professional ice hockey player

References

Notes

Sources

Cities and towns in Leningrad Oblast
Vyborgsky District, Leningrad Oblast
Populated coastal places in Russia
Port cities and towns in Russia
Port cities and towns of the Baltic Sea
Karelian Isthmus
Oil terminals
Naukograds